Adrianne Ho is a Canadian model, designer, and director. She lives in both Los Angeles and New York City, while frequently working abroad. Since 2005, she has made numerous appearances for magazines, fashion editorials, and beauty campaigns.

She is also the host and creator of a series titled Sweat the City on Canadian television channel One. She is a global brand ambassador for Adidas and has been featured on Sports Illustrated.

She runs the lifestyle website Sweat The Style and has created her own swimsuit-line. She created Seed Sport, the first luxe activewear collection for Seed Heritage.

Early life
Ho was born in North York, Toronto. Her father, Man Shun ('Horace') Ho, is Hong-Kong-born, Chinese. Her mother, Christiane (née Nicolette), is French.

She is the younger sister of actress Sandrine Holt who also appeared as a model in the 1990s.

Career

Modeling

Ho has been signed to Sutherland Models and Next Model Management. As of 2017, she has appeared on billboards and ads for Vogue China, Esquire Singapore, Female Singapore, Shape Magazine, Mercedes-Benz, Maybelline, MAC Cosmetics, L'Oreal, and Sephora. In 2013 she modeled for Forever 21 and Complex Media. Editorials include: H&M, The Covateur, HYPEBAE, Highsnobiety, Life+Times, Hypebeast, Complex. In 2017, Ho became a global brand ambassador for Adidas.

Designing

She is the designer and founder of Sweat-Crew, a women's line of active-wear. In 2021, she launched her concept brand, The Farmers Market Global.

External links

References

1989 births
Living people
Businesspeople from Toronto
Canadian expatriates in the United States
Canadian fashion designers
Female models from Ontario
Canadian people of Chinese descent
Canadian people of French descent
21st-century Canadian businesswomen
21st-century Canadian businesspeople
Canadian women fashion designers